Isopimara-7,15-diene synthase (EC 4.2.3.44, PaTPS-Iso, copalyl diphosphate-lyase (isopimara-7,15-diene-forming)) is an enzyme with systematic name (+)-copalyl diphosphate-lyase (isopimara-7,15-diene-forming). This enzyme catalyses the following chemical reaction

 (+)-copalyl diphosphate  isopimara-7,15-diene + diphosphate

The enzyme only forms isopimara-7,15-diene.

References

External links 
 

EC 4.2.3